Samuel Ault (1814 – August 28, 1895) was an Ontario political figure. He was a Liberal-Conservative member of the House of Commons of Canada representing Stormont from 1867 to 1872.

He was born in Osnabruck Township, Upper Canada in 1814, the son of Nicholas Ault, a United Empire Loyalist of German descent, and Margaret Ross. Ault married Catherine Valentine Loucks. With his brothers, he operated a general store, Ault Brothers Ltd., in the village of Charlesville, later renamed Aultsville in his honour. He served on the municipal council, later becoming reeve and then warden for the United Counties of Stormont, Dundas and Glengarry. Ault represented Stormont County in the Legislative Assembly of the Province of Canada from 1861 to 1866 and then in the House of Commons after Confederation. He was also a lieutenant in the local militia.

Aultsville was later submerged beneath the waters of the Saint Lawrence River when the Saint Lawrence Seaway was built.

References 

1814 births
1895 deaths
Members of the Legislative Assembly of the Province of Canada from Canada West
Conservative Party of Canada (1867–1942) MPs
Members of the House of Commons of Canada from Ontario
People from the United Counties of Stormont, Dundas and Glengarry